Denys George Irving (1944-1976), was born on 4 January 1944 in Colwyn Bay, North Wales.

Biography
He grew up in South London and was educated at Dulwich College (1954–1961), where he was awarded the Fawkes Memorial Scholarship to Balliol College, Oxford (1962), where he read Philosophy, Politics and Economics. After graduating in 1966 he went on to study at the London School of Economics, and was a graduate student in the Philosophy Ph.D. program at Columbia University, New York.

Whilst at Columbia in 1968, Denys was actively involved in student politics, notably during the student demonstrations in May, when he was prominent among a large number of students who occupied Fairweather Hall.
It was at Columbia that Denys became interested in artificial intelligence and started working with computers. In December 1968 he wrote to his parents: "I have been working with computers this term and I have made pretty good progress so far and my plan is to try to get accepted by the Royal College of Art (film department) to do research into computer generated research and music." He acknowledged that "the chances (of being accepted) are pretty slim." (This assessment proved correct and Denys's application to the Film School was rejected. Perhaps what he was trying to do was a bit too avant-garde for the film establishment of the time). During his stay in New York Denys recorded (as Dennis Irving) an interview with the American Jazz/Experimental composer Sun Ra for Pacifica Radio.

Using Columbia University's mainframe computer he developed programs to produce short computer generated silent films. In a letter dated 9 May 1969 he referred to "working on my various films in the face of incredible and demented opposition. I may manage to finish one or more before I leave!"
In New York Denys pioneered projection systems for ‘psychedelic’ effects, initially using liquid inks on glass slides, and later combining these with a variety of photographic images. He mounted a powerful projector in his tiny apartment in the East Village and projected images onto the building opposite, often attracting substantial crowds.

On his return to London in 1969, Denys continued to be interested in making films and in record production. He set up a company called Lucifer films Ltd. with Naomi Zack who he'd met at Columbia University. Lucifer films developed into Lucifer recordings, and produced various records that Howard Marks (who he met at Oxford) later described as ‘proto punk’, Howard also contributed financially to support Denys' work. Lucifer released several singles, including the infamous "Fuck You" and two LPs, "Big Gun" and "Exit" in which he played all the instruments and also provided the vocals. These were available by mail order through ads in various music papers including Record Mirror & New Musical Express & via the underground press, including Oz magazine and International Times . The "Exit" LP was the soundtrack to the recently rediscovered ‘motor-cycle shock film’ "Exit" which Denys co-wrote & co-directed with Naomi and starred in. The film has been digitized by Barney Platts-Mills and received a much belated premiere at The Portobello Pop Up Cinema on 30 September 2012 and was screened at the British Film Institute  on 17 April 2015 as part of 'Cinema Born Again: Radical Film from the 70s'.
Around this time he also worked as a roadie for The Pink Floyd.

In a letter to his parents dated 6 May 1970, he refers to a recent TV programme Disco 2 and asks "Did you see my nude body on Disco 2?  They apparently couldn’t use my computer film, (presumably "69",) but they did use the footage of another film I made in America." 
Around 1975, Denys became interested in synthesizers and, working with his friend Mike Ratledge of Soft Machine, constructed a prototype synthesizer that Ratledge used on the soundtrack to the 1977 film 'Riddles of the Sphinx' (directed by Laura Mulvey & Peter Wollen).

In America, he had taken up hang gliding and he continued to pursue this interest in England. In August 1976 his hang glider crash landed at Mill Hill, Sussex, and he was fatally injured. He left a wife, Merdelle Jordine, (an actress who was one of the first black women to appear in a British soap opera, Crossroads,  playing Trina MacDonald 41 episodes, 1978-1982), whom he had married in 1975, and a son Arthur.

Denys was an attractive and charismatic character who enjoyed operating on the frontier of new developments and challenging the established order of things.
It is something of an irony that Denys died in the year that micro-computers became available. The personal Computer medium would have provided the ideal tool and vehicle for his exciting and creative energies. He was a pioneer in early computer generated animation and his work was recently shown at the Tate Gallery, London.
Two of his computer generated films "69" & "Now" are held in the LUX collection.

References
‘Mr Nice’ (Secker and Warburg, 1996) by Howard Marks

‘Howard Marks, His Life and High Times’ (Unwin Hyman, 1988) David Leigh,

‘A history of artists' film and video in Britain’, 1897 – 2004, (British Film Institute Publishing, 2006) by David Curtis.

& the e-book ‘Rogue Males: Richard Burton, Howard Marks and Sir Richard Burton’ (2010) by Rob Walters.

With additional biographical information provided by Andrew Irving.

External links
 Lucifer on myspace
 Denys Irving's films at Lux
 International Times
 OZ magazine
 Accident report in British Hang Gliding History
 'EXIT' at the BFI'
 Denys Irving at BFI ('Riddles of the Sphinx')
 Merdelle Jordine
 1968 Sun Ra interview 

1944 births
1976 deaths
British experimental filmmakers